The 2022 Cologne Centurions season is the second season of the new Cologne Centurions team in the European League of Football.

Preseason
After the contract of head coach Kirk Heidelberg wasn't extended, the Cologne Centurions secured the services of Frank Roser. In September 2021, their league MVP Madre London re-signed with the Centurions for the 2022 season. However, in March 2022, he joined the Pittsburgh Maulers of the United States Football League ahead of the league's inaugural season.

Regular season

Standings

Schedule

Source: europeanleague.football

Roster

Transactions
From Stuttgart Surge: Louis Geyer (February 21, 2022)

Staff

Notes

References 

Cologne Centurions (ELF) seasons
Cologne Centurions
Cologne Centurions